Kácov railway station is a disused railway station in Kácov in the  Central Bohemian Region
of the Czech Republic.

References

External links
Official page at Czech Railway

Kutná Hora District

Railway stations in Central Bohemian Region